The 1981 World Table Tennis Championships men's doubles was the 36th edition of the men's doubles championship.

Li Zhenshi and Cai Zhenhua won the title after defeating Xie Saike and Guo Yuehua in the final by three sets to one.

Results

See also
List of World Table Tennis Championships medalists

References

-